The Men's 1975 USA Outdoor Track and Field Championships took place between June 25–27 at Hayward Field on the campus of University of Oregon in Eugene, Oregon. The Women's Championships took place in less elegant conditions at White Plains High School in White Plains, New York. The meet was organized by the Amateur Athletic Union. This was the last edition to segregate genders.

The men's marathon championships were held at the Western Hemisphere Marathon in Culver City, California, on December 7, 1975. The women's Marathon championships were held in the New York Marathon, September 28, 1975.

Results

Men's track events

Men's field events

Women's track events

Women's field events

See also
United States Olympic Trials (track and field)

References 

 Results from T&FN
 results

USA Outdoor Track and Field Championships
Usa Outdoor Track And Field Championships, 1975
Track and field
1975 in sports in Oregon
Track and field in Oregon
Outdoor Track and Field Championships
Outdoor Track and Field Championships
Sports in New York (state)
Track and field in New York (state)